Pegadomyia is a genus of flies in the family Stratiomyidae.

Species
Pegadomyia ceylonica Rozkošný & Kovac, 2008
Pegadomyia nana Rozkošný & Kovac, 2008
Pegadomyia nasuta Rozkošný & Kovac, 2008
Pegadomyia pruinosa Kertész, 1916

References

Stratiomyidae
Brachycera genera
Taxa named by Kálmán Kertész
Diptera of Asia
Diptera of Australasia